Dhoria
is a large village of Gujrat District, in the Punjab province of Pakistan.[1] It is part of Kharian Tehsil and is located at 32°46'0N 73°50'0E with an altitude of 256 metres (843 feet). Dhoria has many communities – Gujjar, Mughal, Sayed, jatt and large number of Bhatti cast, and many other castes. Dhoria used to be an agricultural village, but some persons have business and many persons go to abroad for temporarily employment and business. Many have settled abroad in almost every country of the world. It is a fairly rich and small town on the Dinga to Kharian road.

The village has good road connection the nearby cities and village and is centrally located for educational, business and medical facilities. It is a hub of activity throughout the day visited by the villagers around Dhoria to buy & sell commodities, visit hospitals, go to schools or just travel through.

The population is reasonably educated and over the years has produced soldiers, sailors, pilots, engineers, accountants, doctors, teachers and many other professionals.

References

Union councils of Gujrat District
Populated places in Gujrat District